David Whitehorn Arnott (23 June 1915 – 10 March 2004) was a British linguist who was Professor of West African Languages at School of Oriental and African Studies. He is known for his works on Fulani and Tiv.

Works
His works are the following:
 Dictionnary of verb roots in Fulfulde dialects
 Fula language studies : present position and future prospects
 The languages of West Africa
 The nominal and verbal system of Fula
 The parent and the teacher: a grammatical analysis of a Fula text
 Particles in Fula : their behaviour and meanings
 Proverbial lore and word-play of the Fulani

See also
Kathleen Arnott

References

1915 births
2004 deaths
Academics of SOAS University of London
Linguists from the United Kingdom
British Africanists
Alumni of SOAS University of London